The 1985 European Baseball Championship was held in the Netherlands and was won by the Netherlands. Italy finished as runner-up.

Standings

References
(NL) European Championship Archive at honkbalsite

European Baseball Championship
European Baseball Championship
1985
1985 in Dutch sport